Zapiola is a surname. Notable people with the surname include:

José Zapiola (1802–1885), Chilean musician, composer, and orchestra conductor
José Matías Zapiola (1780–1874), Argentine brigadier